Daniel Havel (born 10 August 1991) is a Czech sprint canoeist who has competed since the late 2000s.  He is a two-time Olympic bronze medalist.

Career
Havel began to train in sprint canoe in 1999.

He won the bronze medal in the K-4 1000 m event at the 2010 ICF Canoe Sprint World Championships in Poznań.

In 2012, he won silver in the same event at the World Championships in Duisburg. That year, the Czech K-4 1000 m team he was part of won Olympic bronze. In 2013, at the European Championships, the K-4 1000 m team won gold, while the K-2 1000 m team Havel shared with Jan Sterba, won bronze. In 2014, he completed his set of K-4 1000 m World Championship medals, winning gold in Moscow.

In 2015, the Czech K-4 1000 m team won World bronze again. At the European Championships that year, Havel repeated the results of the 2013 European Championships.

At the 2017 World Championships, he won bronze in the K-2 1000 m and the K-4 500 m.

Havel sold trophies he was awarded following his Olympic medals to support young Czech canoeists.

His wife, Andrea Havlova, is also an international competitor in the sprint canoe.

References

External links

Czech male canoeists
Olympic canoeists of the Czech Republic
Canoeists at the 2012 Summer Olympics
Canoeists at the 2016 Summer Olympics
Olympic bronze medalists for the Czech Republic
Olympic medalists in canoeing
Living people
Canoeists from Prague
1991 births
ICF Canoe Sprint World Championships medalists in kayak
Medalists at the 2012 Summer Olympics
Medalists at the 2016 Summer Olympics
European Games competitors for the Czech Republic
Canoeists at the 2015 European Games